Różewo  is a village in the administrative district of Gmina Nowy Dwór Gdański, within Nowy Dwór Gdański County, Pomeranian Voivodeship, in northern Poland.

Before 1772 the area was part of Kingdom of Poland, 1772-1919 Prussia and Germany, 1920-1939 Free City of Danzig, 1939 - February 1945 Nazi Germany. For the history of the region, see History of Pomerania.

The village has a population of 90.

References

Villages in Nowy Dwór Gdański County